Sleep efficiency (SE) is the ratio between the time a person spends asleep, and the total time dedicated to sleep (i.e. both sleeping and attempting to fall asleep or fall back asleep). It is given as a percentage. SE of 80% or more is considered normal/healthy with most young healthy adults displaying SE above 90%. SE can be determined with a polysomnograph and is an important parameter of a sleep study.

Sleep efficiency is often described as the ratio between time spent asleep ("total sleep time (TST)"), and time spent "in bed" ("time in bed (TIB)"), however, TIB does not encompass "non-sleep-related activities" performed in bed (e.g. reading, watching television, etc.) as the phrase may seem to suggest.

Clinical significance 
Apparently long sleep duration may in fact be a sign of low sleep efficiency. SE is significantly reduced in insomnia; SE is therefore an important clinical parameter in clinical investigations of insomnia. SE declines with age and low SE is common in the elderly. Furthermore, lower values of SE are often observed in sleep studies on pregnant populations and are mostly explained by the increased awakening periods after sleep onset (''wake after sleep onset (WASO)'').

Research 
Reduced SE was found to be associated with increased frequency of nightmares in one study.

Some studies have reported a beneficial effect of exercise on SE in participants affected by insomnia. However, a meta-analysis of four studies (with a total of 186 participants) did not find exercise to significantly affect SE in people with insomnia.

A study on subjects from contemporary African and South American hunter-gatherer ethnic groups found that their SE was comparable to SE in industrial societies.

References 

Sleep medicine
Sleep